James Yates Coop (17 September 1927 - November 1996) was an English professional footballer who played as a winger in the Football League for Sheffield United and York City, and in non-League football for Brodsworth Main and Goole Town.

References

1927 births
1996 deaths
People from Horwich
Sportspeople from Lancashire
English footballers
Association football forwards
Brodsworth Welfare A.F.C. players
Sheffield United F.C. players
York City F.C. players
Goole Town F.C. players
English Football League players